Tennis competitions at the 1982 Asian Games in Delhi were held from 22 November to 4 December 1982 at the R. K. Khanna Tennis Complex in New Delhi, India.

South Korea dominated the competition winning four gold medals.

Medalists

Medal table

References

External links
Olympic Council of Asia

 
1982 Asian Games events
1982
Asian Games
1982 Asian Games
Asian